The 1930 Boston University Pioneers football team was an American football team that represented Boston University as an independent during the 1930 college football season. In its first season under head coach Hilary Mahaney, the team compiled a 1–7–1 record, was shut out in five of nine games, and was outscored by a total of 235 to 33.

Schedule

References

Boston University
Boston University Terriers football seasons
Boston University football